Enterocloster is a genus of anaerobic bacteria. Many species in Enterocloster were historically ordered in the genus Clostridium before advances in phylogenetics supported formation of a new genus.

References

Lachnospiraceae
Taxa described in 2020
Gram-positive bacteria